Colm Nulty is an Irish cyclist. He won the Rás Tailteann in 1971.

Early life
Nulty is a native of County Meath.

Career
Nulty began his career in 1965, racing with the St. Patrick's club. He won the 1971 Rás Tailteann, racing with the Meath A Team.

In 1974 Nulty won the Laragh Classic and the Rás Mumhan.

Nulty won the Irish National Cycling Championships (NCA) 100-mile race in 1972, 1974 and 1976.

In 1977 he won the Rudge Cup and the Liam Toolan Memorial. His last title was the 1981 Midland Cup Road Race.

References

Irish male cyclists
Rás Tailteann winners
Sportspeople from County Meath
Year of birth missing (living people)
Living people